Ronald Charles Plaza (August 24, 1934 – April 15, 2012) was American professional baseball player, coach and manager. Though he never made it to Major League Baseball as a player, he was a coach at the MLB level for the Seattle Pilots, Cincinnati Reds and Oakland Athletics. Later in life, he resided in St. Petersburg, Florida, and worked with the Athletics as a scout and coach for their minor league operations.

Career
In , with the Hamilton Cardinals, he led the Pennsylvania–Ontario–New York League with 37 doubles, was third in the league with 106 RBI and was fifth in the league in walks. He also committed a league-leading 37 errors at third base.

Pilots General Manager Marvin Milkes let Plaza go along with the rest of the coaching staff as the team struggled with bankruptcy and a host of other issues after completing their one and only season in Major League Baseball. His term with the Pilots earned him mention in Jim Bouton's book Ball Four, as "The Drill Instructor."

Plaza coached in the Cincinnati Reds' farm system following his stint in Seattle, and joined the big league club following the  season.

See also

 1969 Seattle Pilots season

References

External links

1934 births
2012 deaths
Albany Cardinals players
Allentown Cardinals players
Atlanta Crackers players
Billings Mustangs managers
Charleston Marlins players
Cincinnati Reds coaches
Hamilton Cardinals players
Johnson City Cardinals players
Major League Baseball first base coaches
Major League Baseball third base coaches
Omaha Cardinals players
Rochester Red Wings players
San Juan Marlins players
Seattle Pilots coaches
Oakland Athletics coaches
Oakland Athletics scouts
Sportspeople from Clifton, New Jersey